Plain Jane may refer to:

Plain Jane, a 1922 play by McElbert Moore
Plain Jane (Wednesday Theatre), an Australian TV movie
Plain Jane (TV series), a U.S. TV series airing on The CW
Plain Jane (band), an American band from the late 1980s
Plain Jane (album), a 2009 album by Chantal Kreviazuk
"Plain Jane" (song), a 2017 song by rapper ASAP Ferg
"Plain Jane", a 1959 song by Bobby Darin
"Plain Jane", a 1979 song by Sammy Hagar on Street Machine
"Plain Jane", a 2015 song by Jewel on Picking Up the Pieces
"Plain Jane", a 2020 song by D-Block Europe

See also
Plain Jane Automobile, an American indie rock band
The P.L.A.I.N. Janes, a comic book series